Tasogare Romance (黄昏ロマンス) (English: Twilight Romance) is the sixteenth single by the Japanese Pop-rock band Porno Graffitti. It was released on November 10, 2004.

The song is Nippon TV drama, "Ichiban Taisetsuna Hitoha Daredesuka? (一番大切な人は誰ですか?)" Theme song.

Track listing

References

2004 singles
Porno Graffitti songs

2004 songs
SME Records singles